Diman Regional Vocational Technical High School is a public vocational high school located in Fall River, Massachusetts. The high school serves a regional school district comprising the city of Fall River, and the surrounding towns of Somerset, Swansea and Westport. The school has an enrollment of over 1,400 students and offers vocational-technical education in 18 different programs.

The school also includes the Diman Regional School of Practical Nursing, offering post-graduate education in the field of practical nursing.

Diman received national attention in January 2018, when then-United States Representative Joe Kennedy III gave the Democratic Party's response to Donald Trump’s 2018 State of the Union Address from the school’s automotive shop. Massachusetts’s 4th congressional district, which Kennedy represented at the time, includes the school.

History
The school was founded in Fall River as Diman Vocational School in 1912 by Reverend John Diman, a then Episcopal minister who had previously started Diman School for Boys (later renamed St. George's School) in Middletown, Rhode Island. Rev. Diman later converted to Catholicism, became a Benedictine monk, and helped found Portsmouth Abbey School in Portsmouth, Rhode Island.

The Diman Regional Charter was established in 1963 to expand the area of the school's enrollment to include the surrounding towns of Somerset, Swansea and Westport, Massachusetts. The current campus on Stonehaven Road in Fall River opened in 1968.

Vocational programs
Diman currently offers 18 vocational shop programs to students, which are as follows:

Advanced Manufacturing (formerly Machine Tool Technology)
Automotive Collision, Repair, and Refinishing
Automotive Technology
Building and Property Maintenance
Business Technology
Carpentry-Cabinetmaking
Culinary Arts
Dental Assisting
Drafting
Electricity
Electronics
Graphic Communications
Health Assisting
HVAC/R (Heating, Ventilation, Air Conditioning, and Refrigeration)
Medical Assisting
Metal Fabrication & Joining Technologies
Plumbing
Programming and Web Development

Notable alumni
The below are considered distinguished alumni of Diman and are members of Diman's "Alumni Hall of Fame":
Emeril Lagasse - (1977) - Celebrity chef.
William A. Flanagan - (1998) - Mayor of Fall River from 2010–2014.

Athletics

After an almost 30-year hiatus, Diman re-introduced football to the school in 2005. Diman's athletic teams compete at the Division 3 level of Massachusetts Interscholastic Athletic Association athletics, and at Division 3 for football. They compete in the Mayflower League, which is the largest athletics conference in Massachusetts, with 18 schools.

In 2013, the Diman football team won the Mayflower League Championship for the first time in school history. In the process, they also qualified for the MIAA Division 6 State Playoffs. The Bengals won their first round match-up against Upper Cape, but eventually lost the following week to a powerful Millis/Hopedale cooperative team.

The member schools of the Mayflower League are as listed below.

Mayflower League

Avon High School, Avon
Bishop Connolly High School, Fall River
Blue Hills Regional Technical High School, Canton
Bristol County Agricultural High School, Dighton
Bristol-Plymouth Regional Technical High School, Taunton
Cape Cod Regional Technical High School, Harwich
Diman Regional Vocational Technical High School, Fall River
Holbrook Jr/Sr High School, Holbrook
Nantucket High School, Nantucket
Norfolk County Agricultural High School, Walpole
Old Colony Regional Vocational Technical High School, Rochester
Sacred Heart High School, Kingston
Southeastern Regional Vocational Technical High School, Easton
South Shore Vocational Technical High School, Hanover
Tri-County Regional Vocational Technical High School, Franklin
Upper Cape Cod Regional Technical High School, Bourne
West Bridgewater High School, West Bridgewater
Westport High School, Westport

Former Members
Martha's Vineyard Regional High School, Edgartown
Saint John Paul II High School, Hyannis
Chatham High School, Chatham
Harwich High School, Harwich
Provincetown High School, Provincetown

References

Schools in Bristol County, Massachusetts
Buildings and structures in Fall River, Massachusetts
Public high schools in Massachusetts